María Ortiz Heras (born 10 February 1999) is a Spanish footballer who plays as a defender for Granadilla.

Club career
Ortiz started her career at Cituat de Torrent.

References

External links
Profile at La Liga

1999 births
Living people
Women's association football defenders
Spanish women's footballers
People from Torrent, Valencia
Sportspeople from the Province of Valencia
Footballers from the Valencian Community
Valencia CF Femenino players
UD Granadilla Tenerife players
Primera División (women) players
Segunda Federación (women) players